Scaptius sordida is a moth in the family Erebidae. It was described by Walter Rothschild in 1909. It is found in Peru, Paraguay and Brazil.

Subspecies
Scaptius sordida sordida (Peru)
Scaptius sordida pygmaea (Rothschild, 1935) (Brazil: Amazons)

References

Phaegopterina
Moths of South America
Moths described in 1909
Taxa named by Walter Rothschild